The 2011 Badminton Asia Championships was the 30th tournament of the Badminton Asia Championships. It was held in Chengdu, China from April 19 to April 24, 2011.

Medalists

Final Results

Men's singles

Women's singles

Men's doubles

Women's doubles

Mixed doubles

Medal table

External links
Badminton Asia Championships 2011 at tournamentsoftware.com

Badminton Asia Championships
Asian Badminton Championships
2011 Asia Championships
Badminton Asia Championships